Christopher Martin Goode (born 12 October 1984) is an English cricketer who played for Northamptonshire. He was born in Kettering.

Goode made a single first-class appearance, during the 2004 season, against Worcestershire. As a bowler, he scored no runs in the first innings in which he batted, and didn't bat in the second innings. He took 1-70 in the match claiming the wicket of Vikram Solanki. Northamptonshire drew the match.

External links
Chris Goode at Cricket Archive

1984 births
English cricketers
Northamptonshire cricketers
Sportspeople from Kettering
Living people
Bedfordshire cricketers